Saadeddine Othmani (born 16 January 1956), sometimes translated as Saad Eddine el-Othmani, is a Moroccan politician. He served as the 16th prime minister of Morocco from 17 March 2017 to 7 October 2021. Previously he served as foreign minister from 2012 to 2013.

Following the legislative elections of November 25, 2011 giving victory to the PJD, he was appointed on January 3, 2012, by King Mohammed VI, Minister of Foreign Affairs and Cooperation, a position he held until October 10, 2013.  Since 2002, he has also been a member of the Maghreb Council of the Choura, the advisory council of the Arab Maghreb Union.

Early life and education 
Othmani was born in 1956 in Inezgane, near Agadir, in the Souss region. He comes from a famous Chleuh family from Sous originating from the village of Aguercif (a small village that belongs to the Amanouz tribes near Tafraout), which according to Mohamed Mokhtar Soussi, is "one of the only two families in Morocco where science has been perpetuated for more than a thousand years”. This is Islamic jurisprudence and not science in the modern sense. His family immigrated to a village in the Ammelne valley and then to Inezgane.

In 1976, he received his baccalaureate in math, he then moved to Casablanca to pursue a PhD at the city's Faculty of Medicine and Pharmacy, which he received in 1987. He also studied Islamic Studies at the Faculty of Sharia Law in Aït Melloul, receiving his bachelor's degree in 1983 and his master's degree in 1987. In 1994, he began practicing as a psychiatrist.

He has written numerous books on psychology and Islamic law, and worked as the editor-in-chief of many magazines and publications.

Political career 
In 2004, after the withdrawal from politics of Abdelkrim Alkhatib, Othmani became the head of the Justice and Development Party (PJD). At the time, he was also a parliamentary deputy of Inezgane. He was later succeeded by Abdelilah Benkirane in 2008, and became leader of the party once again in 2017 following Benkirane's failure to form a government.

Othmani was Minister of Foreign Affairs from 3 January 2012 to 10 October 2013 in the government headed by his party, the PJD. He was succeeded as Minister of Foreign Affairs by Salaheddine Mezouar. Subsequently, he headed the parliamentary group of the PJD.

On 17 March 2017, Othmani was appointed as Prime Minister by King Mohammed VI. Othmani later stated that his appointment as the Prime Minister was "unexpected."

On 25 March 2017, Othmani announced that the government he was leading would include the PJD, the National Rally of Independents (RNI), the Popular Movement (MP), the Constitutional Union (UC), the Party of Progress and Socialism (PPS) and the Socialist Union of Popular Forces (USFP).

His cabinet was formed on 5 April 2017. His government was viewed as francophile. On 26 November 2017, Othmani announced the dismissal of four cabinet members for allegedly failing to implement the government's development program for Morocco's northern Al-Rif region.

On 24 August 2020, Othmani along with his party rejected the Israel–Morocco normalization stating it's breaching Palestinians’ rights. 10 months later, Othmani received Hamas leader Ismail Haniyeh in Rabat to express his support for the Palestinian cause.

On 8 September 2021 in the legislative elections his party won 13 of the 395 seats, losing nearly 90% of the seats obtained in 2016. After the devastating political defeat, former PJD leader and prime minister of Morocco, Abdelilah Benkirane, called upon Othmani to resign from his position. Many politicians blamed Othmani for his poor performance. The following day, Othmani decided to resign from his position as Secretary General of the Justice and Development Party. Aziz Akhannouch of the National Rally of Independents was appointed by Mohammed VI on 10 September to form a government, and formally succeeded him on 8 October.

Personal life 
In October 2021, Othmani resumed his job at his private psychiatric practice in Rabat. He also released a book about the path of prominent Moroccan figures in the world of jurisprudence and politics.

References

1956 births
Government ministers of Morocco
Justice and Development Party (Morocco) politicians
Living people
Moroccan Muslims
Members of the House of Representatives (Morocco)
Moroccan Berber politicians
Moroccan psychiatrists
People from Agadir
Prime Ministers of Morocco
Shilha people
University of Hassan II Casablanca alumni